G protein pathway suppressor 2 is a protein that in humans is encoded by the GPS2 gene.

Function 

This gene encodes a protein involved in G protein-mitogen-activated protein kinase (MAPK) signaling cascades. When overexpressed in mammalian cells, this gene could potently suppress a RAS- and MAPK-mediated signal and interfere with JNK activity, suggesting that the function of this gene may be signal repression. The encoded protein is an integral subunit of the NCOR1-HDAC3 (nuclear receptor corepressor 1-histone deacetylase 3) complex, and it was shown that the complex inhibits JNK activation through this subunit and thus could potentially provide an alternative mechanism for hormone-mediated antagonism of AP1 (activator protein 1) function.

Interactions 

GPS2 (gene) has been shown to interact with:

 C21orf7,
 Cyclin A1, 
 EP300, 
 HDAC3,
 NCOR1, 
 P53,  and
 TBL1X.

References

Further reading